Ulvinsalo Strict Nature Reserve is located in the Kainuu region of Finland. Wild forest reindeer (Rangifer tarandus fennicus) has been living here for ages. There is a trail in the park, but using it requires a permit.

Strict nature reserves of Finland
Geography of Kainuu
Kuhmo